The Naga Students' Federation (NSF) is the largest representative body for students of the Naga people. It was established on 29 October 1947.

History
On 7 May 1947, student leaders from Angami, Ao, Lotha, Sümi gathered at Kohima and decided to have the inaugural session of the Naga Students' Federation on 17 May 1947. However, the proposed meeting could only be held from 29 to 30 October 1947 whereby NSF came into being under the Chairmanship of Z. Ahu.

The second session of the Naga Students' Federation was held in Mokokchung from 13 to 15 October 1948. However, after the second session the NSF went defunct for 17 years due to the rising Naga political crisis and the imposition of Army Rule in the Naga Hills. 

The NSF became fully functional only in 1971.

On 20 March 1986, two students Kekuojalie Sachü and Vikhozo Yhoshü were killed in indiscriminate firing by Nagaland Police when they participated in a peaceful protest called by the NSF to rally against the state government's decision on the introduction of Indian Police Service (IPS) cadres and the extension of the Disturbed Area Belt from 5 to 20 km along the Indo-Myanmar (Indo-Burma) border. The event was so tumultuous that it led three Cabinet ministers and five state ministers of Nagaland to resign.
In commemoration of the incident, the NSF Martyrs' Memorial Trophy is held annually.

Executive members
The Naga Students' Federation executive members for the 2021–23 tenure are:

See also
 Naga Students' Union, Delhi

References

External links
 Official website

 Organisations based in Kohima
Organisations based in Nagaland
Organizations established in 1947
1947 establishments in India